Thomas Fortescue (1784–1872) was a civil servant and secretary.

Fortescue, son of Gerald Fortescue, by Elizabeth, daughter of John Tew, acted as secretary to his cousin, Henry Wellesley, lieutenant-governor of the recently ceded province of Oudh, 1801–3. On the capture of Delhi, October 1803, he was appointed civil commissioner there. 

He married on 19 March 1859 Louisa Margaret, second daughter of Thomas Russell, and died on 7 September 1872. Part of his official correspondence is preserved at the British Museum.

References

Attribution

1784 births
1872 deaths
British people in colonial India
Administrators in British India
Thomas